Area codes 408 and 669 are telephone area codes in the North American Numbering Plan (NANP) in the U.S. state of California. The numbering plan area comprises most of Santa Clara County and Northern Santa Cruz County, and includes Gilroy, Morgan Hill, Saratoga, Los Gatos, Monte Sereno, Milpitas, Sunnyvale, Santa Clara, Cupertino, Campbell, and San Jose.

Area code 408 was split from area code 415 in 1959, and area code 669 was assigned to the same numbering plan area in an overlay plan in 2012.

History
As of 1950, the central and northern regions of California had been divided into two numbering plan areas (NPAs) along a south–north boundary, with area code 415 assigned to the coastal stretch, and 916 for the mountainous region in the east.

Area code 408 was split from numbering plan area 415 in a flash-cut (without permissive dialing period) on March 1, 1959.

On July 11, 1998, area code 408 was split, producing area code 831 for the counties of Santa Cruz, Monterey, and San Benito. Despite this split, the 408 area code is still used in northern Santa Cruz County.

On November 20, 2012, numbers in a new overlay area code 669 became available for assignment to new customers, requiring the use of ten-digit dialing in the entire area.

Los Gatos 
Los Gatos is one of three cities in Santa Clara County that was not served by the Bell System. Gilroy and Morgan Hill were also outside the Regional Bell Operating Company (RBOC) service area. These communities were served by what was referred to in "Bell System circles" as "independent" telephone companies.

According to historian Willys I. Peck, the Los Gatos Telephone Company was the first company to offer telephone service in town. Later, the Western California Telephone Company provided service to Los Gatos and to Novato, Morgan Hill, and Kenwood. In the 1970s, the utility was acquired by General Telephone and Electronics, which changed its name to GTE, and merged with Bell Atlantic in 2000 to become Verizon Communications. Verizon served these areas until April 1, 2016, when Frontier Communications took over the service.

Los Gatos is served by three central offices. Historically, these were called the Six Office, the Four Office, and the Mountain Office. The first two of these designations come from the historic exchange names when the town converted from manual to dial service. Phone numbers in these two offices were ELgato-6 and ELgato-4 numbers, respectively (dialed as ELx-xxxx.) As the area migrated to seven-digit numbers, these changed to 356- and 354-numbers. In their earlier life, all numbers for the segment of town served by each office had the respective prefix or office code related to that office.

As late as the early 1980s, before the modern system of digital transcribing was widely available, billing information for calls placed from Los Gatos was recorded on magnetic tape and sent to a centralized processing center in Southern California. As the tapes were processed, the charges found their way to subscribers' bills.

The Mountain Office served the Summit Road community and areas of the Santa Cruz Mountains west of town. Although the office code or prefix for service from this switch was ELgato-3 (later 353),  it was not referred to as the Three Office. During the 1970s and early 1980s, the area was served by Automatic Electric step-by-step (SXS) electromechanical switching equipment. The step office was a maintenance headache; it being in a rural area made the problem more difficult. Users noticed crosstalk, and dial pulsing was audible during at least some of their calls. Outside the plant in the mountain area was subject to a variety of tough environmental factors, including long loop lengths and the high humidity of the redwood forest. The area is now served by remote equipment on Summit Road connected to the central office on Los Gatos Boulevard.

Before the late 1980s and the arrival of cellular and PCS mobile phone service, GTE offered Improved Mobile Telephone Service (IMTS) on VHF (152 MHz) and UHF (454 MHz) frequencies in Los Gatos. The service included full-duplex dial service. There were tight restrictions on call lengths because there were only a few channels available. In the late 1970s, daytime calls longer than three minutes were billed at over $1 per minute to discourage the long-winded. The VHF equipment was located near the Santa Clara Valley Water District's Rinconada Water Treatment Plant on More Avenue at NAD27 coordinates . The IMTS system included General Electric mobile radio voting equipment. (Voting is a form of diversity combining used in mobile radio systems on land.) One receiver for at least one of the voted IMTS channels was located in a pole mount-cabinet on a utility pole along Montevina Road off California State Route 17. These IMTS systems were dismantled after cellular systems became available to subscribers in the Bay Area.

San Jose

Manual service
Before 1949, San Jose telephones were manual service. A subscriber would lift the receiver and wait for the operator to inquire, "Number Please?" Most telephone numbers started with Ballard or Columbia. Mayfair numbers served the east side. The City Manager's number was Ballard 1 while most numbers had four digits and a letter, (for example: Ballard 2345 W). One of four letters was appended to telephone numbers: J, M, R, or W. These letters may have tipped off the operator as to the proper keys to press to ring a subscriber who was on a party line.

Dial service and numbering plan
After the conversion to dial service in 1949, San Jose telephone numbers started with names including ALpine-, ANdrews-, BAldwin-, CLayburn-, and CYpress-. As the North American Dialing Plan evolved in the 1950s, these became today's 25x-, 26x-, 22x-, 258-, and 29x-numbers, respectively.

When area codes were introduced in 1947 San Jose was assigned to area code 415 along with the rest of the San Francisco Bay Area and much of northern California. Area code 408 was created on January 1, 1959, and included most of Santa Clara, Santa Cruz, Monterey and San Benito Counties. Until the late 1970s, there was permissive dialing between (408) and (415). At the time, the entire East Bay, peninsula, and on to Marin County was in area code (415). Phone numbers were not duplicated across (415) and (408), so subscribers could dial seven-digit San Francisco or Berkeley numbers without dialing an area code and the call would go through. Population growth, facsimile machines, and pagers caused demands for numbers to outrun the capacity of this permissive dialing plan. The additional demands for PCS and cellular phone numbers helped necessitate the (831)/(408) area code split, the (650)/(415) split, and the earlier (510)/(415) split.

Part of the previous permissive dialing plan included a mass calling prefix for radio station contests, introduced in the 1960s because some contests put unacceptable loads on the Bay Area's telephone switches. Until the 1980s, radio station call-in contests throughout the Bay Area used 575-numbers. Electromechanical switching equipment of the day had been engineered to accommodate large call volumes to 575-numbers. Large numbers of calls would otherwise have overloaded switching equipment causing slow dial tone and blocked long-distance circuits.

A patchwork quilt of electromechanical switching equipment handled San Jose calls between 1949 and the 1980s. There were about eight Western Electric Crossbar switches, at least one Number 1 and mostly Number 5. There was a Western Electric 4A Crossbar that took up two floors of the Main telephone exchange. In the mid-1980s, the 4A crossbar was replaced with a digital switch which took up part of a single floor and quadrupled calling capacity.

The 408 area code was the last area code in the United States to institute the requirement of dialing "1" before making a long-distance call.

Mobile service
Before the existence of cell phones, Improved Mobile Telephone Service (IMTS) was offered. As of 1983, three VHF and two UHF channels were available. Subscribers had either a VHF or UHF vehicle-mounted phone, consequently they could access only two or three channels over the entire San Jose area. On VHF, the maximum system capacity for the San Jose system was three simultaneous calls.  There was a roaming feature, but no registration scheme like the ones used by modern PCS and cell phones.

List of places
Alum Rock, Bell Station, Buena Vista, Burbank, Campbell, Casa Loma, Loma Chiquita, Chemeketa Park, Cupertino, East Foothills, Fruitdale, Glenwood, Gilroy, Holy City, Laurel, Lexington Hills, Los Gatos, Milpitas, Monte Sereno, Morgan Hill, a small part of Mountain View, Redwood Estates, Rucker, San Antonio Valley, San Jose, San Martin, Santa Clara, Saratoga, Sargent, Seven Trees, Sunnyvale (except the westernmost edge), Sunol-Midtown, Sveadal, Zayante

Creation of the 669 overlay 
Since the 408 area code was close to being exhausted, a new area code became necessary in the region. The 408 area code was forecast to require a new area code by the second quarter of 2012. From May to October 2011, public feedback was solicited to residents in the area.

On October 20, 2011, the California Public Utilities Commission confirmed implementing 669 as an overlay to the existing 408 area code, the first in the San Francisco Bay Area. The new area code became active in November 2012, following a six-month permissive dialing period.

AT&T telephone bills shortly before the overlay was to go into effect included the following information for 408 area code customers:
 Effective April 21, 2012, you should begin the new dialing procedures [i.e., to use the area code] whenever you place a call from the 408 area code. If you forget and dial just seven digits, your call will still be completed.
 Beginning October 20, 2012, you must use the new dialing procedures (...) for all calls. After this date, if you do not use the new dialing procedures, your call will not be completed and a recording will instruct you to hang up and dial again.
 Beginning November 20, 2012, new telephone lines or services may be assigned numbers using the 669 area code.

See also
List of California area codes

References

External links 

Telecommunications-related introductions in 1959
Telecommunications-related introductions in 2012
408 and 669
408 and 669
Northern California